Clarin, officially the Municipality of Clarin,  is a 5th class municipality in the province of Bohol, Philippines.  According to the 2020 census, it has a population of 21,158 people.

Geography

Clarin is bounded by Tubigon in the west, Inabanga in the NE, Sagbayan in the east, and Catigbian in the south.

Barangays

Clarin comprises 24 barangays:

Climate

History
Clarin was formed on 31 January 1919 from five barrios of Tubigon by virtue of proclamation by Governor General Francis Burton Harrison, hence it celebrated its centennial in 2019.

Clarin was severely affected by the 2013 Bohol earthquake which damaged 1358 homes, of which 221 were totally destroyed, as well as the Catholic church.

Demographics

Economy

Education

References

External links

 [ Philippine Standard Geographic Code]
Municipality of Clarin
Municipality of Clarin
Bohol

Municipalities of Bohol